This is a list of women artists who were born in France or whose artworks are closely associated with that country.

A
Louise Abbéma (1853–1927), painter, sculptor, designer 
Georges Achille-Fould (1868–1951), painter
Françoise Adnet (1924–2014), figurative painter
Hélène Agofroy (born 1953), contemporary artist
Georgette Agutte (1867–1922), painter 
Fanny Alaux (1797–1880), painter
Lou Albert-Lasard (1885–1969), painter
Yvette Alde (1911–1967), painter
Jeanne Amen (1863–1923), painter.
Beatrice Valentine Amrhein (born 1961), painter
Anastasia (fl. c.1400), manuscript illuminator
Virginie Ancelot (1792–1875), painter, writer
Hélène Marie Antigna (1837–1918), painter
Lydie Arickx (born 1954), painter
Yolande Ardissone (born 1927), painter
Geneviève Asse (1923–2021), painter
Pauline Auzou (1775–1835), painter

B
Anna Barbara Bansi (1777–1863), painter
Jeanne Bardey (1872–1954), painter, sculptor
 Estelle de Barescut, painter and lithographer
Nina Barka (1908–1986), Russian-born French painter
Françoise Basseporte (1701–1780), painter
Marie-Adélaïde Baubry-Vaillant (1829–after 1881), painter
Amélie Beaury-Saurel (1849–1924), painter
Hélène de Beauvoir (1910–2001), painter 
Gabrielle Bellocq (1920–1999), painter, artist in pastels
Denise Bellon (1902–1999), photographer associated with Surrealism
Marie-Guillemine Benoist (1768–1826), painter
Marcelle Bergerol (1900–1989), painter
Augusta Bernard (1886–1946), fashion designer
Solange Bertrand (1913–2011), painter, sculptor, engraver
Adélaïde Binart (1769–1832), painter
Lucienne Bisson (1880–1939), painter
Marie Blancour (fl. 1650–1699), painter 
Cathryn Boch (born 1968), multi-media artist
Jeanne Bonaparte (1861–1910), painter, sculptor
Juliette Bonheur (1830–1891), painter
Rosa Bonheur (1822–1899), painter
Claire Bouilhac (born 1970), bande dessinée illustrator, scriptwriter, colorist
Marie Bouliard (1763–1825), portrait painter
Madeleine Boullogne (1646–1710), still life painter
Louise Bourgeois (1911–2010), sculptor
Antoinette Bouzonnet-Stella (1641–1676), engraver
Claudine Bouzonnet-Stella (1636–1697), engraver 
Marthe Boyer-Breton (1879–1926), painter  
Marie Bracquemond (1841–1916), painter
Elisa Breton (1906–2000), artist, writer
Geneviève Brossard de Beaulieu (fl. 1770–1815), painter
Henriette Browne (1829–1901), orientalist painter
Élise Bruyère (1776–1847), painter
Marie-Abraham Rosalbin de Buncey (1833–1891), painter
Berthe Burgkan (1855–1936), painter

C
Marcelle Cahn (1895–1981), painter
Joséphine Calamatta (1817–1893), painter, engraver
Blanche-Augustine Camus (1884–1968), painter
Yvonne Canu (1921–2008), painter
Marie-Gabrielle Capet (1761–1818), painter
Henriette Cappelaere (fl. 1846–1859), painter
Annie Cardin (born 1938), painter
Madeleine Carpentier (1865–1940), painter
Marguerite Jeanne Carpentier (1886–1965), painter, sculptor
Renée Carpentier-Wintz (1913–2003), painter 
Béatrice Casadesus (born 1942), painter, educator
Madeleine Caudel (1879–1962), landscape painter
Madame Cavé (c.1809–1883), painter, teacher
Berthe Cazin (1872–1971), painter, potter, goldsmith
Marie Cazin (1845–1924), painter, sculptor
Camille Chantereine (1810–1847), painter
Angelique Charbonée (c.1740–after 1780), engraver
Eugénie Charen (1786–1824), painter
Émilie Charmy (1878–1974), avant-garde painter 
Constance Marie Charpentier (1767–1849), painter
Zoé-Laure de Chatillon (1826–1908), painter
Francine Charderon (1861–1928), portrait painter
Jeanne-Elisabeth Chaudet (died 1832), painter
Germaine Chaumel (1895–1982), illustrator 
Aimée Julie Cheron (1821–c.1840), miniature painter
Li Chevalier (born 1961), painter, installation artist 
Geneviève Claisse (1935–2018), abstract painter
Marie Jeanne Clemens (1755–1791), French-Danish engraver, pastel artist
Marie-Amélie Cogniet (1798–1869), painter
Héloïse Colin (1819–1873), painter, fashion illustrator
Uranie Alphonsine Colin-Libour (1833–1916), painter
Jacqueline Comerre-Paton (1859–1955), painter 
Delphine Arnould de Cool-Fortin (1830–1921), painter, writer
Louise Zoé Coste (1805–after 1861), painter
Lucie Cousturier (1876–1925), painter, writer
Laure Coutan-Montorgueil (1855–1915), sculptor
Marie Courtois (c.1655–1703), miniature painter
Marguerite Crissay (1874–1945), painter, sculptor
Béatrice Cussol (born 1970), artist, writer

D
Jeanne Bernard Dabos (1765–1842), miniature painter
Augustine Dallemagne (1821–1875), miniature painter
Hermine David (1886–1970), painter
Césarine Davin-Mirvault (1773–1844), painter
Marie-Victoire Davril (1755–1820), painter
Elsa Dax (born 1972), painter
Iphigénie Decaux-Milet-Moreau (1778–1862), flower painter 
Herminie Déhérain (1798–1839), painter
Julie Delance-Feurgard (1859–1892), painter
Sonia Delaunay (1885–1979), Ukrainian-born French painter
Marguerite Delorme (1876–1946), painter 
Virginie Demont-Breton (1859–1935), painter
Claudie Titty Dimbeng (born 1968), Ivorian-born abstract painter
Émilie Desjeux (1861–1957), painter
Louise-Adéone Drölling (1797–1836), painter
Angèle Dubos (1844–1916), painter
Victoria Dubourg (1840–1926), flower painter
Suzanne Duchamp-Crotti (1889–1963), painter
Catherine Duchemin (1630–1698), flower and fruit painter
Rose-Adélaïde Ducreux (1761–1802), painter, musician
Clémentine-Hélène Dufau (1869–1937), painter 
Adélaïde Dufrénoy (1765–1825), poet, painter
Marie-Adélaïde Duvieux (1761-1799), miniature painter
Natalia Dumitresco (1915–1997), Romanian-born French abstract painter
Thérèse-Marthe-Françoise Dupré (1877–1920), realist painter
Pierrette-Madeleine-Cécile Durand (1745–1831), painter

E 
Diane Esmond (1910–1981), British-born French Post-Impressionist painter

F
Nina Fagnani (1856–1928), American-born French miniature painter
Hélène Feillet (1812–1889), painter and lithographer
Jeanne Fichel (1849–1906), painter
Clara Filleul (1822–1878), painter and children's writer
Rosalie Filleul (1752–1794), pastellist, painter
Fanny Fleury (1848–1920), painter
Marie-Anne-Julie Forestier (1782–1843), painter
Brigitte Lovisa Fouché (born 1958), painter
Pauline Fourès (1778–1869), painter, novelist
Consuelo Fould (1862–1927), painter 
Marie-Anne Fragonard (1745–1823), miniature painter
Sophie Fremiet (1797–1867), painter 
Charlotte Eustace Sophie de Fuligny-Damas (1741–1828), flower painter

G
Marie-Élisabeth Gabiou (1761–c.1811), painter
Beya Gille Gacha (born 1990), sculptor
Annick Gendron (1939–2008), abstract painter
Marguerite Gérard (1761–1837), painter, etcher
Louise Germain (1874–1939), painter 
Françoise Gilot (born 1921), painter, writer
Marie-Suzanne Giroust (1734–1772), painter
Paule Gobillard (1867–1946), painter
Marie-Éléonore Godefroid (1778–1849), portrait painter
Eva Gonzalès (1849–1883), Impressionist painter
Adrienne Marie Louise Grandpierre-Deverzy (1798–1869), painter
Anna-Geneviève Greuze (1762–1842), painter
Henriette Gudin (1825–1892), marine painter
Rosina Mantovani Gutti (1851–1943), painter
Maximilienne Guyon (1868–1903), painter

H
Adélaïde Victoire Hall (1772–1844), Swedish-French painter
Hortense Haudebourt-Lescot (1784–1845), genre painter
Jeanne Hébuterne (1898–1920), painter 
Blanche Hennebutte-Feillet (1815–1886), lithographer
Emma Herland (1856–1947), painter 
Louise Marie-Jeanne Hersent-Mauduit (1784–1862), painter
I.J. Berthe Hess (1925–1996), painter 
Marie-Anne Horthemels (1682–1727), engraver
Louise-Magdeleine Horthemels (1686–1767), engraver
Marguerite J. A. Houdon (1771–1795), painter
Joséphine Houssaye (1840–1901), painter
Marie Huet (born 1859), painter
Julie Hugo (1797–1865), painter
Anne Marguerite Hyde de Neuville (1771–1849), painter

I
Camille Cornelie Isbert (1825–1911), painter
Jeanne Itasse-Broquet (1867–1941), sculptor

J
Marguerite Jacquelin (1850s–1941), flower painter
Nélie Jacquemart (1841–1912), painter, art collector
Jeanne Jacquemin (1863–1938), painter
Marie Victoire Jaquotot (1772–1855), painter
Marine Joatton (born 1972), contemporary artist

K
Bernadette Kanter (born 1950), sculptor

L
Élodie La Villette (1848–1917), painter
Adélaïde Labille-Guiard (1749–1803), miniaturist and portrait painter
Espérance Langlois (1805–1864), painter, printmaker
Oriane Lassus (born 1987), cartoonist, illustrator
Marie Laurencin (1883–1956), painter, printmaker
Suzanne Laurens, sculptor
Andrée Lavieille (1887–1960), painter
Marie Adrien Lavieille (1852–1911), painter
Marie Ernestine Lavieille (1852–1937), painter
Marie-Élisabeth Laville-Leroux (1779–1826), painter
Jeanne-Philiberte Ledoux (1767–1840), painter
Anne-Louise Le Jeuneux (died 1794), painter 
Madeleine Lemaire (1845–1928), painter
Marie-Victoire Lemoine (1754–1820), painter 
Thérèse Lemoine-Lagron (1891–1949), painter
Sonia Lewitska (1880–1937), Ukrainian-born painter, printmaker, working in France
Sophie Lienard (died 1845), portrait miniaturist
Marianne Loir (1715–1769), portrait painter
Henriette Lorimier (1775–1854), portrait painter 
Séraphine Louis (1864–1942), painter
Marie Lucas Robiquet (1858–1959), Orientalist painter

M
Dora Maar (1907–1997), photographer, poet, painter
Sophie Mallebranche (born 1976), artist, textile designer
Julie Manet (1878–1966), painter
Maria Manton (1910–2003), painter 
Marie Antoinette Marcotte (1869–1929), painter
Jacqueline Marval (1866–1932), painter
Lidiya Masterkova (1927–2008), Russian-born French painter
Catherine Matausch (born 1960), French journalist and painter
Marie-Alexandrine Mathieu (1838–1908), artist known for her etchings
Caroline de Maupéou (1836–1915), painter
Constance Mayer (1775–1821), painter
Caroline Mesquita (born 1989), sculptor
Victorine Meurent (1844–1927), painter
Angélique Mezzara (1793–1868), painter
Ksenia Milicevic (born 1942), painter, architect
Miss Van (born 1973), graffiti artist
Miss.Tic (born 1956), street wall artist, poet
Louise Moillon (1610–1696), Baroque painter
Blanche Hoschedé Monet (1865–1947), painter
Angélique Mongez (1775–1855), painter
Émilie-Sophie de Montullé (1756–1816), painter
Mirka Mora (1928–2018), French-born Australian visual artist
Blanche Moria (1858–1927), sculptor
Eulalie Morin (1765–1837), portrait painter 
Berthe Morisot (1841–1895), Impressionist painter
Tania Mouraud (born 1942), contemporary artist
Euphémie Muraton (1840–1914), painter

N
Afi Nayo (born 1969), painter
Aurélie Nemours (1910–2005), abstract painter
Marie Nicolas (1845–1903), painter
Marie-Thérèse de Noireterre (1760–1823), miniaturist

O
Princess Marie of Orléans (1813–1839), sculptor, designer

P
Marie Parrocel (1743–1824), painter
Gabrielle-Charlotte Patin (1666–1751), numismatist, writer, painter
Blanche Paymal-Amouroux (1860–1910), painter
Marie Petiet (1854–1893), painter 
Laure Pigeon (1882–1965), Spiritualist artist
Alice Prin (1901–1953), painter, writer

Q
Anna Quinquaud (1890–1984), explorer and sculptor

R
Alice Rahon (1904–1987), French-Mexican Surrealist artist, poet
Marie Raymond (1908–1988), abstract painter
Marie Magdeleine Real del Sarte (1853–1927), painter
Marie-Thérèse Reboul (1728–1805), still life painter
Hortense Richard (1860–1939/1940), painter 
Adèle Riché (1791–1878), painter
Jeanne Rij-Rousseau (1870–1956), Cubist painter
Cendrine Robelin (born 1983), contemporary artist
Juliette Roche (1884–1980), Cubist painter
Michèle Van de Roer (born 1956), Dutch-born painter, photographer, engraver
Adèle Romany (1769–1846), miniature painter
Jeanne Rongier (1852–1929), painter
Charlotte de Rothschild (1825–1899), socialite, painter
Jeanne Royannez (1855–1932), sculptor

S
Apollonie Sabatier (1822–1890), courtesan, salon holder
Niki de Saint Phalle (1930–2002), sculptor, painter, filmmaker
Eugénie Salanson (1836–1912), painter
Louise-Joséphine Sarazin de Belmont (1790–1871), painter, lithographer
Félicie Schneider (1831–1888), portrait painter
Marie-Ernestine Serret (1812–1884), painter, pastellist
Marguerite Sirvins (1890–1957), outsider textile artist
Élisabeth Sonrel (1874–1953), painter, illustrator
Anne Strésor (1651–1713), painter, nun
Élisabeth Swagers (c.1775–1837), painter

T
Élisabeth-Claire Tardieu (1731–1773), engraver
Henriette Tirman (1875–1952), painter, printmaker
Sophie de Tott (1758–1848), painter

V
Suzanne Valadon (1865–1938), painter
Frédérique Vallet-Bisson (1862–1949), painter
Anne Vallayer-Coster (1744–1818), painter
Caroline de Valory (born 1790), painter, engraver
Angélique-Louise Verrier (1762–1805), painter
Marie-Nicole Vestier (1767–1846), painter
Maria Helena Vieira da Silva (1908–1992), Portuguese-French abstract painter 
Élisabeth Vigée Le Brun (1755–1842), painter
Marie-Denise Villers (1774–1821), portrait painter
Élodie La Villette, (1848–1917) landscape painter
Henriette Vincent (1786–1834), botanical painter
Stéphanie de Virieu (1785–1873), painter, sculptor

W
Hermine Waterneau (1862–1916), painter
Emilie Jenny Weyl (1855–1934), sculptor
Sabine Weiss (1924–2021), photographer

Z
Jenny Zillhardt (1857–1939), painter

-
French women artists, List of
artists, List of French
Artists